Eudonia minusculalis is a moth of the family Crambidae. It was described by Francis Walker in 1866. It is endemic to New Zealand. Adult moths have been recorded as visiting the flowers of Leptospermum scoparium and likely feeding from and pollinating them.

References

Moths described in 1866
Moths of New Zealand
Eudonia
Endemic fauna of New Zealand
Taxa named by Francis Walker (entomologist)
Endemic moths of New Zealand